Parapielus is a genus of moths of the family Hepialidae.

Species
Parapielus heimlichi Ureta, 1956
Parapielus luteicornis Berg, 1882
Parapielus oberthuri Viette, 1952
Parapielus reedi Ureta, 1957

Hepialidae
Exoporia genera
Taxa named by Pierre Viette